The Nanaimo Clippers are a Junior "A" ice hockey team based in Nanaimo, British Columbia, Canada. They are members of the Island Division of the British Columbia Hockey League (BCHL). They play their home games at Frank Crane Arena.

Franchise history 
The original owner, Cliff McNabb, drew inspiration for the Clippers name from the local teams of the Nanaimo Minor Hockey Association prior to 1972 which carried the clippers name. 
The Nanaimo Clippers won the league championship in the 1976 playoffs but lost by default for the Mowat Cup (Provincial Championship). The Clippers were once again league champions in 1978 when the Penticton Vees refused to play the balance of the series (citing rough play – the series stood at 2 games to 1). The Merritt Centennials were earlier chosen to represent the league for the 1978 CAHA Championships. The Nanaimo Clippers folded after the 1982 season, but were started up again before the 1983 season as the Esquimalt Buccaneers. The franchise was moved to Nanaimo early in the 1983 season, playing at the Nanaimo Civic Arena, and renamed the team the Nanaimo Clippers.

In 1998, the Clippers hosted the Royal Bank Cup getting three wins and a loss in round-robin play. The Clippers entered the semi-finals as the second seed behind the South Surrey Eagles also of the BCHL. The Weyburn Red Wings were the Clippers' opponent in the semi-final and defeated them by a score of 4–1, South Surrey went on to win the National Championship.

On March 13, 2004, with 80 seconds left in the third period and the score tied 3–3 in game seven during the first round of the playoffs against Powell River Kings, the Powell River goalie left his crease and froze the puck for a whistle. Under league rules, the goalie was guilty of delay of game. But instead of calling a two-minute penalty, the referee incorrectly awarded a penalty shot.  Nanaimo scored and won the game, 4–3. Powell River protested and league officials agreed to cover all costs for fixing the mistake. The Kings went back to Nanaimo on March 16 to replay the final 1:20 of the third period, with the score tied at 3–3. Powell River started a man short for the delay-of-game penalty but neither team scored in regulation. Just 54 seconds into overtime, Nanaimo captain Michael Olson scored the game-winning goal. The Clippers went on to beat Chilliwack 3–1 in a best-of-five series, Surrey 4–0 in a best-of-seven semifinal and the Salmon Arm Silverbacks 4–1 in the best-of-seven championship final.  After taking the BCHL Championship, the Clippers went on to oust the Grande Prairie Storm for the Doyle Cup, earning themselves a berth in the Royal Bank Cup.

On April 16, 2007, the Clippers won the Fred Page Cup by defeating the Vernon Vipers three to two in game six of the BCHL finals. The winning goal was scored by Tyler Mazzei with 36 seconds remaining in the third period at the Vernon Multiplex.

In March 2017, the Nanaimo city council approved a referendum for the construction of a $88 million dollar arena to help solidify a potential Western Hockey League team, either by relocation or expansion, possibly forcing the Clippers to either relocate to another market or fold. The referendum was on March 11 and was rejected by 80% of those voting. The team was purchased by Vancouver-based lawyer Wesley Mussio in 2017.

Season-by-season record 
Note: GP = Games played, W = Wins, L = Losses, T = Ties, OTL = Overtime losses, Pts = Points, GF = Goals for, GA = Goals against, PIM = Penalties in minutes

NHL alumni

See also 
 List of ice hockey teams in British Columbia

References

External links 
 

British Columbia Hockey League teams
Sport in Nanaimo
1972 establishments in British Columbia
Ice hockey clubs established in 1972